Margretta "Gretta" Kok (born 16 October 1944, in Amsterdam) is a retired Dutch breaststroke swimmer who participated in the 1960 and 1964 Summer Olympics. In 1960, she was fifths in the 200m breaststroke event, whereas in 1964 she did not reach the final. In 1966, she won a gold medal in the 4 × 100 m medley relay at the European Aquatics Championships. Her younger sister, Ada Kok, was also an Olympic swimmer and part of the same team that won the medley gold in 1966.

References

1944 births
Living people
Dutch female breaststroke swimmers
Olympic swimmers of the Netherlands
Swimmers at the 1960 Summer Olympics
Swimmers at the 1964 Summer Olympics
Dutch female backstroke swimmers
Swimmers from Amsterdam
European Aquatics Championships medalists in swimming
20th-century Dutch women